Fox 50 may refer to:

 The Fox 50, an industrial index of large companies put together by the Fox Business Network
 WKBD, a former Fox-affiliated television station in Detroit, Michigan
 WRAZ (TV), a Raleigh, North Carolina, Fox-affiliated television station